Miss USA 1965 was the 14th Miss USA pageant, held in Miami Beach, Florida on June 4, 1965.  This was the first Miss USA pageant to be televised live (on the CBS network), and the first to be a self-contained production, held several weeks before, and independent of, the Miss Universe pageant.

The pageant was won by Sue Downey of Ohio, who was crowned by outgoing titleholder Bobbi Johnson of the District of Columbia.  Downey went on to place as 2nd runner-up to Apasra Hongsakula of Thailand at Miss Universe 1965.  Pageant finalist Dianna Lynn Batts (better known as Dian Parkinson from The Price Is Right) later won the 1965 Miss World USA title, and placed 1st runner-up to Lesley Langley of the United Kingdom at Miss World 1965.

Results

Special awards

Historical significance 
 Ohio wins competition for the first time. Also becoming in the 12th state who does it for the first time.
 Arizona earns the 1st runner-up position for the first time.
 New Mexico earns the 2nd runner-up position for the first time.
 Kentucky earns the 3rd runner-up position for the first time.
 District of Columbia earns the 4th runner-up position for the first time.
 States that placed in semifinals the previous year were Alabama, California, District of Columbia, Kentucky, New York, Ohio, Oklahoma, Texas and Utah.
 California and New York placed for the ninth consecutive year. 
 District of Columbia placed for the fourth consecutive year. 
 Alabama and Oklahoma placed for the third consecutive year. 
 Kentucky, Ohio, Texas and Utah made their second consecutive placement.
 Arizona, Michigan, Nevada, New Mexico and South Carolina last placed in 1963.
 Hawaii last placed in 1962.

Delegates
The Miss USA 1965 delegates were:

 Alabama - Leigh Sanford
 Alaska - Carla Sullivan
 Arizona - Jane Nelson
 Arkansas - Jeri Haynie
 California - Kathryn Hage
 Colorado - Cathy McPherson
 Connecticut - Elizabeth Matsuko
 Delaware - Shirl Chappell
 District of Columbia - Diana Lynn Batts
 Florida - Karol Kelly
 Georgia - Judy Simpson
 Hawaii - Elithe Aguiar
 Illinois - Diane Gortz
 Indiana - Lora Starr
 Iowa - Mari Hardy
 Kansas - Linda Bergsten
 Kentucky - Julie Andrus
 Louisiana - Terri Sommers
 Maine - Georgia Wilson
 Maryland - Barbara Keifer
 Massachusetts - Mary Lou Volpe
 Michigan - Susan Pill
 Minnesota - Elizabeth Carroll
 Mississippi - Madeline Scarbrough
 Missouri - Barbara Brooks
 Montana - Patricia Bradford
 Nebraska - Constance Kellogg
 Nevada - Denyse Turner
 New Hampshire - Judy Morrison
 New Jersey - Kay Franzen
 New Mexico - Judy Baldwin
 New York - Gloria Jon
 North Carolina - Sandra Farmer
 North Dakota - Patricia Dodge
 Ohio - Sue Downey
 Oklahoma - Cheryl Semrad
 Oregon - Leslie Bruchner
 Pennsylvania - Beverly Rudolph
 Rhode Island - Paula Farrow
 South Carolina - Vickie Harrison
 Tennessee - Bonnie Perkins
 Texas - Phyllis Johnson
 Utah - Janice Sadler
 Vermont - Andrea Kenyon
 Virginia - Mary Montgomery
 Wisconsin - Judith Achtor
 Wyoming - Linda Peck

No state delegate: Idaho, South Dakota, Washington, West Virginia

External links 
 

1965
1965 in the United States
1965 beauty pageants